Judith Amanda Geeson (born 10 September 1948)  is an English film, stage, and television actress. She began her career primarily working on British television series, with a leading role on The Newcomers from 1965 to 1967, before making her major film debut in To Sir, with Love (1967). She starred in a range of films throughout the 1970s, from crime pictures to thriller and horror films, including The Executioner (1970), Fear in the Night (1972), Brannigan (1975) and The Eagle Has Landed (1976).

Geeson appeared in several stage productions in the 1980s, including two for the Royal Shakespeare Company, as well as an Off-Broadway production of The Common Pursuit (1986). After relocating to the United States she returned to television, playing the recurring character of Maggie Conway in the American series Mad About You from 1992 until 1999, as well as a recurring role on Gilmore Girls in 2002. In 2012 and 2016, she appeared in Rob Zombie's The Lords of Salem and 31, respectively.

Early life
Judy Geeson was born in Arundel, Sussex. Her father was an editor for the National Coal Board magazine. Her sister Sally Geeson, also an actress, is known for her roles in British television sitcoms of the 1970s. Geeson attended Corona Stage Academy and made her stage debut in 1957.

Career

Geeson's professional acting career started in July 1962, with an appearance in an episode of the television series The Probation Officer. Her first major film appearances came in 1967, with roles in To Sir, with Love and Berserk!. She followed these films with the comedy Here We Go Round the Mulberry Bush (1968). Geeson became well known as a result of a regular role in the BBC early-evening soap opera The Newcomers. She also had a major role in the mid-1970s costume drama Poldark as Caroline Penvenen (later Caroline Enys).

Geeson's other films include Prudence and the Pill (1968), Three into Two Won't Go (1969), 10 Rillington Place (1970), Doomwatch (1972), Brannigan (1975), starring John Wayne, and The Eagle Has Landed (1976). In the TV series Danger UXB (1979) she played the female lead, Susan Mount, opposite Anthony Andrews. She also had the lead role of Fulvia in the science fiction series Star Maidens (1976).

In addition to her film and television work during this time, Geeson also performed in theatrical productions for the Royal Shakespeare Company as Lavinia in Titus Andronicus and as Viven 532 in Section Nine (both 1973). She also had roles in stage productions of Next Time I'll Sing to You (1980) and The Real Thing (1985), both in London, before making her Off-Broadway debut in The Common Pursuit in 1987.

Geeson relocated from London to Los Angeles in 1984; there she began appearing in American television, including a role as a series regular in the sitcom Mad About You, playing the hostile neighbour, Maggie Conway, from 1992 to 1999. She also played the role of Sandrine in the Star Trek: Voyager episodes "The Cloud" and "Twisted".

Having appeared in a number of horror films during the 1970s and 1980s, including Fear in the Night (1972), A Candle for the Devil (1973), Dominique (1978) and Inseminoid (1981), Geeson returned to the horror genre in The Lords of Salem (2012), directed by Rob Zombie. The film marked her return to acting following a nine-year absence. She portrayed Sister Dragon in Rob Zombie's slasher film 31 which was released in 2015.

Personal life
In the 1970s, Geeson lived with set designer Sean Kenny until his death in 1973. She was married to actor Kristoffer Tabori from 1985 until their divorce in 1989. In a 2015 interview, Geeson stated that she had resided in Los Angeles, California, for the past 30 years.

Filmography

Film

Television

Stage credits

Notes

References

Works cited

External links

Judy Geeson at HorrorStars

1948 births
20th-century English actresses
21st-century English actresses
Actresses from Sussex
British expatriate actresses in the United States
English expatriates in the United States
English film actresses
English Shakespearean actresses
English stage actresses
English television actresses
English voice actresses
English women in business
Living people
People from Arundel
British comedy actresses